is a Japanese rower. He competed in the men's eight event at the 1976 Summer Olympics.

References

1951 births
Living people
Japanese male rowers
Olympic rowers of Japan
Rowers at the 1976 Summer Olympics
Place of birth missing (living people)